Club Deportivo Tenerife "B" is the reserve team of CD Tenerife, it is based in Santa Cruz de Tenerife, in the autonomous community of the Canary Islands. Currently plays in Tercera Federación – Group 12, holding home games at Ciudad Deportiva Javier Pérez, with a 1,000-seat capacity.

History
In 1980, Club Deportivo Salud (founded in 1961 and registered in the Federación Tinerfeña de Fútbol in 1967) was acquired by CD Tenerife, being made its reserve team alongside CD Tenerife Aficionados (founded in 1960 as CD Tenerife Atlético). It first played in the third division in 1989–90.

In 1992, the team was renamed Unión Deportiva Tenerife Salud, competing for the second time in the third level in the 1995–96 campaign, already as Tenerife B, and again being relegated immediately back. It spent the vast majority of the following decades in division four.

Season to season
Club Deportivo Tenerife "Aficionados"
 

5 seasons in Tercera División

Unión Deportiva Salud

1 season in Segunda División B
12 seasons in Tercera División

Club Deportivo Tenerife "B"

2 seasons in Segunda División B
23 seasons in Tercera División
2 seasons in Tercera Federación

Honours
Tercera División: (3) 1988–89, 2008–09, 2017–18
Copa Heliodoro Rodríguez López: (5) 2001–02, 2002–03 2007–08, 2008–09, 2014–15
Preferente Tenerife: (2) 1981–82, 2004–05

Current squad
.

Youth players

Out on loan

External links
Official website 
Futbolme team profile 

Football clubs in the Canary Islands
Sport in Tenerife
CD Tenerife
Spanish reserve football teams